Aino-Maija Tikkanen (2 November 1927 – 3 March 2014) was a Finnish film actress. She appeared in 15 films between 1954 and 2010 and had a long career at theatre. She died on 3 March 2014 at the age of 86.

Selected filmography

 Evakko (1956)
 The Harvest Month (1956)
 Äideistä parhain (2005)

References

External links

1927 births
2014 deaths
Actors from Turku
Finnish film actresses
Recipients of the Order of the Lion of Finland